Bree Timmins is a fictional character from the Australian soap opera Neighbours, played by Sianoa Smit-McPhee. She made her first screen appearance during the episode broadcast on 4 April 2005. The character was written out in 2006 and she made her final appearance on 13 July 2007.

Casting
Smit-McPhee joined Neighbours in the role of Bree Timmins in early 2005 when she was thirteen years old.

In December 2006 it was announced that the Neighbours producers had decided to write out the characters of Bree and her on-screen mother, Janelle (Nell Feeney). They took the decision not to renew the contracts of Smit-McPhee and Feeney, following the departures of Ben Nicholas (Stingray Timmins) and Damien Bodie (Dylan Timmins). Co-star Ian Smith (Harold Bishop) called the decision a "huge mistake". Bree and Janelle made their final appearances in July 2007. Smit-McPhee later said she left Neighbours "because of the contract and stuff" and that she made the decision with her father. She added "I didn't want to stay (on Neighbours) any longer and if I'd stayed there more than that I would be known as just Bree and I wanted to do something different."

Characterisation
Network Ten describes Bree as being totally different from her siblings as they are not related biologically. They call her a "introverted and studious girl" and the problem solver of the Timmins family. She "clearly possessed an overactive imagination fueled by years of reading trashy novels and her bizarre flights of fantasy made her a bit of an outsider." In her early year she was shy, but when she discovered she was in fact not related to the Timmins she craved a new identity being a "disaffected and disillusioned young adolescent teenager" she transformed into a goth. The Age described the character of Bree as "troubled" and "sullen". They said her major development was "morphing into an 'emo' while grieving for her brother". Of her character, Smit-McPhee said "Bree started off as a geek but a brainy one. When her brother died she didn't really find who she was. I think all teenagers go through that, to find themselves and want to be Paris (Hilton) for a day".

Storylines
Bree won a national spelling bee in 2005 and was the winner of A$15,000 cash prize. She offered the money to her mother, Janelle (played by Nell Feeney), because the family was in debt at the time, but Janelle decided that the family should all get jobs and that Bree was entitled to the money she had won.

Bree re-wrote most of Janelle's first novel The Bogan's Tipped Hair and this was disclosed by Janelle in an (fictional) episode of Rove Live, a real television talk show aired on Network Ten, the same network that Neighbours is aired on.

In 2006 it was discovered during a science project that she is not the biological daughter of Janelle or Kim Timmins (Brett Swain). The midwife who took care of Bree at the hospital revealed that Bree was switched at birth accidentally because she didn't write out the ID tags leading to Bree wanting to find her real family. Bree's search for her real family was kept hidden from her non-biological parents because of what they might have thought, but when Janelle found out about the search, she was supportive. Bree's search ended abruptly when she received a letter from her biological parents telling her to stop searching for them; they do not want to know her.

Lately, she has decided that since she does not know her birth parents, she has no real identity. Consequentially, she has tried a range of new looks, including Paris Hilton, and most recently, Gothic. Her on-and-off boyfriend, Zeke Kinski (Matthew Werkmeister), tried to keep up with her new looks in an effort to impress her.

Bree made friends with her biggest book fan, Anne Baxter (Tessa James), who is blind. Anne was revealed to be the biological daughter of Janelle and Kim Timmins, though she tried to hide it from her and the rest of the Timmins family. Still searching for a non-Timmins identity, Bree looked into changing her name by deed poll, but after finding out that she wasn't old enough, a person must be over 18 to legally change their name she instructed her friend Rachel (Caitlin Stasey) to tell people to call her Trinity Black. After the death of her brother Stingray (Ben Nicholas), Bree dropped the "gothic" theme.

Bree's non-biological grandmother, Loris Timmins (Kate Fitzpatrick) later revealed to Harold Bishop (Ian Smith) that she swapped Bree with Anne when they were babies because she felt Janelle would be an unfit mother. She felt guilty about what she had done and said that she wanted to make things right. She then left Erinsborough. Bree is still unaware that Loris is the cause of the mix-up.

Anne returned in July 2007, and while Bree was pleased to see her, she was soon faced with her biological father (Anne's adoptive father) Greg (Christopher Connolly), who had arrived in Erinsborough looking for Anne. When Greg finally accepted that Bree was really his daughter, they came up with the plan for the Timmins' to move to Cairns, so that the Baxters and Timminses could get to know each other. Dwayne, Brandon and Dylan all live up north, so they would also be closer to them.

The family had a farewell party in the street, where Steiger shocked Janelle by turning it into their wedding. Allan, Janelle, Anne and Bree then flew off to Cairns in a helicopter, leaving the waving neighbours behind.

Reception
For her portrayal of Bree, Smit-McPhee was nominated for Best Young Actor at the 2006 Inside Soap Awards. Larissa Dubecki from The Age praised Bree for redeeming the Timmins family. Dubecki wrote, "played with all the knowing insouciance a 13-year-old can muster by Sianoa Smit-McPhee. Bree is positively sage-like amid the daily hysteria of her mob." She compared Bree to Darlene from Roseanne and added that "her raised-eyebrow archness pleases."

During Bree's parentage storyline, a reporter for the Daily Record commented "Poor Bree. She's never exactly fitted in with the rest of her family. For a start, she's highly intelligent and the sensitive type – two things that the rest of the Timmins clan are rarely accused of being." They observed that Bree had "shown her devious side a few times", suggesting that she might be a Timmins after all.

Katie Baillie, writing for Metro included Bree on a list of the "worst Neighbours characters" ever. She justified Bree's inclusion because "she walked around with a face like a smacked bum, for no good reason." Baillie also disliked Bree's goth phase and said that renaming herself as Trinity Black was "WTF? annoying".

References

External links
Character profile at the Official AU Neighbours website

Adoptee characters in television
Neighbours characters
Television characters introduced in 2005
Female characters in television